is a quasi-national park in the Shimokita Peninsula of Aomori Prefecture in the Tōhoku region of far northern Honshū in Japan. It is rated a protected landscape (category V) according to the IUCN. The park, consists of several discontinuous locations, which include:

 the volcanic peaks and caldera lakes of the Osorezan Mountain Range and surrounding forests.
 Yagen Valley, with its hot springs
 the coastal rock formations of Hotokegaura on the west coast of Shimokita Peninsula
 Cape Ōma, the northernmost point of Honshū
 Cape Shiriya, the northeasternmost point Honshū and the Sarugamori Sand Dunes
 Taijima, an island off the coast of Wakinosawa

The park also encompasses a portion of the natural habitat of the Japanese macaque. The mountainous interior is forested with Siebold's beech and Nootka cypress, and coastal areas have stands of tilia and oak. The area was designated a quasi-national park on July 22, 1968.

The borders of the park span the municipalities of Mutsu, Higashidōri, Sai, and Ōma.

Like all Quasi-National Parks in Japan, Shimokita Hantō Quasi-National Park is managed by the local prefectural government.

Gallery

See also
List of national parks of Japan

References
Southerland, Mary and Britton, Dorothy. The National Parks of Japan. Kodansha International (1995).

External links
 
 Maps of Shimokita Hantō Quasi-National Park

National parks of Japan
Protected areas established in 1968
1968 establishments in Japan
Parks and gardens in Aomori Prefecture
Mutsu, Aomori
Higashidōri, Aomori
Sai, Aomori
Ōma